Francesco Marchetti Selvaggiani (1 October 1871 – 13 January 1951) was an Italian cardinal of the Catholic Church who served as Secretary of the Congregation for the Propagation of the Faith, Vicar General of His Holiness, Secretary of the Holy Office, and Dean of the College of Cardinals. He was elevated to the cardinalate in 1930.

Biography

Early life and ordination
Marchetti Selvaggiani was born in Rome to Vincenzo and Valeria ( Caretti) Marchetti Selvaggiani. A boyhood friend of Eugenio Pacelli (the future Pope Pius XII), he studied at the Almo Collegio Capranica and Pontifical Gregorian University. Marchetti Selvaggiani was ordained to the priesthood by Archbishop Francesco di Paola Cassetta on 4 April 1896.

Roman Curia
He then served in the Congregation for Extraordinary Ecclesiastical Affairs, as a minutante, until 1900. From 1900 to 1906, he was auditor of the Apostolic Delegation to the United States in Washington, D.C. He was attached to the secretariat of the Congregation for Extraordinary Ecclesiastical Affairs for a year before becoming auditor of the Apostolic Nunciature to Germany in 1907. Marchetti Selvaggiani was named privy chamberlain of his holiness on 25 December 1914, domestic prelate of his holiness on 7 July 1915, and protonotary apostolic on 26 September 1917. From 1915 to 1918, he was a confidential representative of the Holy See in Bern, Switzerland.

Nuncio
On 16 February 1918, he was appointed Internuncio to Venezuela and Titular Archbishop of Seleucia di Isauria. He received his episcopal consecration in the chapel of the Pontifical Latin American College on the following 14 April from Cardinal Pietro Gasparri, with Archbishops Carlo Pietropaoli and Bonaventura Cerretti serving as co-consecrators. With the raising in rank of the papal diplomatic mission to Venezuela and of the Venezuelan mission to the Holy See, he became nuncio on 21 May 1920. On 4 December of the same year, he became Apostolic Nuncio to Austria.

Congregation for the Evangelization of Peoples
He was made secretary of the Congregation for the Propagation of the Faith on 15 December 1922. As secretary, he served as the second-highest official of that dicastery under Cardinal Willem van Rossum, CSSR. In addition to his role as secretary, he served as an extraordinary papal envoy to Haile Selassie I, Emperor of Ethiopia.

Cardinal
Pope Pius XI created him Cardinal-Priest of S. Maria Nuova in the consistory of 30 June 1930. In late 1930, in response to a growing Protestant presence in Rome, he was also appointed to head the Pontifical Organization for Preservation of the Faith and for the Provision of New Churches in Rome. On 9 May 1931, Marchetti Selvaggiani was named the Vicar General of Rome; as vicar general, he governed the Diocese of Rome in the name of the pope, who is Bishop of Rome. He advised local priests to avoid theaters and sports games. He became Archpriest of the Lateran Basilica on 26 May 1931, and Cardinal Bishop of Frascati on 15 June 1936.

Secretary of the Holy Office
Just after Pope Pius XII was elected in 1939, Cardinal Donato Sbarretti, head of the Holy Office, died, and Pius named Cardinal Marchetti-Selvaggiani to the position. On becoming the senior cardinal-bishop in 1948, Marchetti-Selvaggiani became dean of the Sacred College and Bishop of Ostia in addition to his first bishopric see. He also succeeded as prefect of the Sacred Congregation Ceremonial, and continued in all these positions until his death.

Death
Selvaggiani died from a cerebral thrombosis in Rome, at age 79. He is buried in Campo Verano.

References

Sources
Catholic Hierarchy
Cardinals of the Holy Roman Church

1871 births
1951 deaths
Clergy from Rome
Deans of the College of Cardinals
Almo Collegio Capranica alumni
Apostolic Nuncios to Austria
Apostolic Nuncios to Venezuela
20th-century Italian cardinals
Cardinal-bishops of Frascati
Cardinal-bishops of Ostia
20th-century Italian Roman Catholic archbishops
Cardinal Vicars
Members of the Holy Office
Pontifical Commission of Sacred Archaeology
Deaths from cerebral thrombosis
Pontifical Gregorian University alumni